The United Mexican States have 18 Designations of Origin (DO, Denominación de Origen in Spanish), granted by the Mexican Institute of Industrial Property (IMPI), which also issues declarations to protect the product, register the brand and authorize its use. However, these names are not created by the IMPI, but rather "exist because of factual situations; that is, they are first used, famous and recognized by the public that consumes them, and later, they are protected through the corresponding declaration".

The first denomination of origin declared in Mexico was tequila in 1974 (DO enjoyed by 181 municipalities distributed between Jalisco, Michoacán, Tamaulipas, Nayarit and Guanajuato), while the last was the Yahualica chili in 2018 (11 municipalities in Jalisco and Zacatecas).

List

References